Servant of the People 2 (Ukrainian: Слуга народу 2, Sluha narodu 2, Russian: Слуга народа 2, Sluga naroda 2) is a 2016 Ukrainian political comedy film based on Volodymyr Zelenskyy's television series Servant of the People, produced and distributed by Kvartal 95 Studio, which also produced the series. The film was directed by Aleksey Kiryushchenko and stars Zelenskyy, who also served as a producer of the film, alongside Anastasia Chepelyuk and returning cast members Evgeniy Koshevoy and Stanislav Boklan. Released between the first and second seasons of Servant of the People, the film follows the efforts of President Vasily Goloborodko (Zelenskyy) to overcome a group of adversarial oligarchs and pass political reforms in order to make Ukraine eligible for IMF financial aid.

Zelenskyy's role in both the TV series and the film is credited with helping him win the vote in the 2019 Ukrainian presidential election.

Plot 
President of Ukraine Vasily Petrovych Goloborodko's proposed reforms, a condition for Ukraine to receive a loan from the International Monetary Fund (IMF), are rejected by the Verkhovna Rada, the Ukrainian parliament. The oligarchs Mamatov, Nimchuk and Roizman, who control the parliamentary factions, offer to pass the reforms if they are able to appoint their puppet as prime minister, a deal which Vasily rejects. Vasily visits former prime minister Yuriy Ivanovich Chuiko, who was arrested on corruption charges two months earlier. Yuriy agrees to provide compromising information on the oligarchs in exchange for full amnesty.

The next day, Yuriy is moved out of prison when the prison van is attacked with a bomb. Vasily and Yuriy observe the latter's funeral in Kyiv from a distance. At the Potocki Palace in Lviv, foreign minister Serhiy Viktorovich Mukhin and his assistant Oksana receive the head of the IMF, where Vasily is due to lead negotiations. Yuriy proposes a plan to turn the oligarchs against each other, and tells Vasily his destination is Kharkiv. Serhiy and Oksana distract the head of the IMF.

Vasily is received by the corrupt governor, an associate of Roizman. Vasily pretends to be corrupt and pressures the governor to help Mamatov instead. However, when the governor offers Vasily bribes, he attacks the governor on television. Yuriy saves the situation by advising Vasily to replace the governor with Mamatov's man, causing a rift between the two oligarchs. 

Vasily and Yuriy head to Zaporizhzhia, where Vasily reveals the corruption in the oblast and its connection to Mamatov in front of television cameras. While staying at a hotel, the two are attacked by thugs. Vasily and Yuriy disguise themselves by dressing in drag and leading the thugs on a car chase, then leaving on a yacht. With parliament getting ready to elect the prime minister the next day, Vasily learns from Yuriy that if parliament fails to elect a prime minister within two months, the president can dissolve parliament. Thus, Vasily can use the threat of dissolution to force parliament to vote for his reforms.

Vasily and Yuriy arrive at Odesa, where Vasily crashes the wedding of Nimchuk's daughter, causing the oligarchs' alliance to collapse. As a result, parliament fails to elect a prime minister and passes the reforms. Yuriy leaves the country. Vasily arrives at Lviv. However, he finds the IMF terms intolerable, and tears up the agreement.

Cast 
 Volodymyr Zelenskyy as Vasily Petrovych Goloborodko, president of Ukraine
 Stanislav Boklan as Yuriy Ivanovich Chuiko, former prime minister
 Yevhen Koshovy as Serhiy Viktorovich Mukhin, Minister of Foreign Affairs
  as Oksana Skovoroda, Mukhin's assistant
 Heorhii Povolotskyy as Tolya, Goloborodko's bodyguard
  as Mikhail Ashotovich Tasunyan, head of the Security Service of Ukraine
 Anastasia Chepelyuk as Anna Mikhailovna, Goloborodko's adviser and lover
 Serhii Kalantai as Otto Adelweinsteiner, head of the International Monetary Fund
 Volodymyr Horiansky as Rustem Ashotovych Mamatov, oligarch
 Yurii Hrebelnyk as Andriy Mykolayovych Nimchuk, oligarch
 Dmytro Lalienkov as Mykhailo Roizman, oligarch
 Verka Serduchka as himself

Production 
Servant of the People 2 was developed by the film studio Kvartal 95.

Filming began August 13, 2016 and was expected to last two and a half months, with 75 days slated for filming. Filming took place in Kyiv, Kharkiv, Zaporizhia, Odesa and Lviv.

The first day of filming took place at the Central Railway Station in Kyiv. A platform and passenger train were leased for the set. Ukrainian journalists were present at the event, and were invited not only to interview the cast and crew, but also to participate in the filming, playing themselves as the Ukrainian media who were there to interview Zelenskyy's character President Goloborodko.

Both filming of this film and filming of the series's second season were set to occur in the same period of time from between October 3 to 6 in Lviv. While at the announcement of the filming location there had been some threats of protest by activists who had previously accused the series of being Ukrainophobic due to the series's use of the Russian language, as well as both the film studio's and Zelenskyy's involvement in a parody of the Ukrainian government, ultimately there was no interference with the production.

Release 
Servant of the People 2 had its premiere in Kyiv on December 19, 2016, and then released widely in Ukraine on December 23, 2016. The film was released in Belarus on April 27, 2017, and was later screened at the Montreal World Film Festival on August 25, 2017.

The television premiere of the film in Ukraine was scheduled to coincide with the Independence Day of Ukraine, on August 24, 2017.

Box office 
In Ukraine, Servant of the People 2 grossed ₴11.3 million ($420,000 USD) on its opening weekend, and has grossed ₴23.7 million ($0.88 million USD) overall by the end of 2017.

Accolades

References

External links 

 
 

2010s political comedy films
2010s satirical films
2016 films
Films about corruption
2010s Russian-language films
Ukrainian political films
Ukrainian comedy films
Volodymyr Zelenskyy films
Films set in Ukraine